Major-General Sir Edward Ritchie Coryton Graham  (1859 − 29 January 1951) was a British Army officer.

Biography
Educated at Eton College and the Royal Military College, Sandhurst, Graham was commissioned into the Cheshire Regiment in 1878 and saw action as Assistant Adjutant-General in South Africa during the Second Boer War. He became commander of the 8th Infantry Brigade in December 1908 and General Officer Commanding  South Midland Division in July 1914 before being replaced in August 1914. He then served as a Deputy Adjutant General for the remainder of the war.

He was colonel of the Cheshire Regiment from 1914 to 1928.

References

|-

1859 births
1951 deaths
Cheshire Regiment officers
British Army generals of World War I
Knights Commander of the Order of the Bath
Knights Commander of the Order of St Michael and St George
People educated at Eton College
British Army major generals
Graduates of the Royal Military College, Sandhurst
British Army personnel of the Second Boer War
Military personnel of British India